The 2017 Japan Super Series is the eighth Super Series badminton tournament of the 2017 BWF Super Series. The tournament took place at the Tokyo Metropolitan Gymnasium in Tokyo, Japan from September 19 – 24, 2017 and had a total purse of $325,000.

Men's singles

Seeds

Top half

Bottom half

Finals

Women's singles

Seeds

Top half

Bottom half

Finals

Men's doubles

Seeds

Top half

Bottom half

Finals

Women's doubles

Seeds

Top half

Bottom half

Finals

Mixed doubles

Seeds

Top half

Bottom half

Finals

References

External links
 Tournament Link

Japan Open (badminton)
Japan
2017 in Japanese sport
Sports competitions in Tokyo
Japan Super Series